Haji Abdikadir (born 15 October 1998) is a professional footballer who plays as a midfielder for Athlone Town. Born in Kenya, he plays for the Somalia national team.

Career

Youth
Abdikadir was born in Biadabo [Somalia], before his family came to the United States when he was eight years old. Abdikadir briefly lived in Florida for three months before settling in Louisville, Kentucky. Abdikadir went on play high school soccer at Louisville Collegiate School, where he was named 2016–2017 All-USA Player of the Year honors and also Gatorade Kentucky player of the year.

In 2017, Abdikadir played with USL PDL side Derby City Rovers, making eight appearances and scoring a single goal.

College
In 2018, Abdikadir attended the University of Louisville to play college soccer. During his three seasons with the Cardinals, including an extended 2020–21 season due to the COVID-19 pandemic, Abdikadir made 43 appearances, scoring four goals and tallying three assists.

Professional
On 24 July 2021, it was announced Abdikadir had signed for USL Championship side San Diego Loyal. He made his professional debut five days later, starting for San Diego in a 2–1 loss to Tacoma Defiance.

On 23 February 2022, Abdikadir's rights were traded to Colorado Springs Switchbacks in exchange for Thomas Amang. Two months later, both sides mutually agreed to terminate his deal with the club.

International
In March 2022, Abdikadir was called up to the Somalia national team. He debuted with Somalia in a 3–0 2023 Africa Cup of Nations qualification loss to Eswatini on 23 March 2022.

References

External links

1998 births
Living people
Sportspeople from Nairobi
People with acquired Somali citizenship
Somalian footballers
Somalia international footballers
Kenyan footballers
Kenyan people of Somali descent
Association football midfielders
Colorado Springs Switchbacks FC players
Derby City Rovers players
Kenyan expatriate sportspeople in the United States
Kenyan expatriate footballers
Somalian expatriates in the United States
Somalian expatriate footballers
Louisville Cardinals men's soccer players
Louisville Collegiate School alumni
San Diego Loyal SC players
USL Championship players
USL League Two players
Athlone Town A.F.C. players
League of Ireland players
Expatriate association footballers in Ireland